How Was I to Know can refer to two unrelated songs, both released in 1997:
"How Was I to Know" (Reba McEntire song)
"How Was I to Know" (John Michael Montgomery song)